Suzana Herculano-Houzel (born 1972) is a Brazilian neuroscientist. Her main field of work is comparative neuroanatomy; her findings include a method of counting of neurons of human and other animals' brains and the relation between the cerebral cortex area and thickness and number of cortical folds .

Biography 
Suzana Herculano-Houzel was born in 1972 in Rio de Janeiro. She graduated in biology at the Federal University of Rio de Janeiro (1992), took a master's degree at Case Western Reserve (1995), and a doctorate in neuroscience at Paris VI University (1999). She was also a post-doctoral fellow at Max Planck Institute for Brain Research (1999).

Herculano-Houzel was a faculty member at the Federal University of Rio de Janeiro from 2002 to May 2016, when she moved to Vanderbilt University.

She published books on popularization of science and writes  columns for Folha de S.Paulo newspaper and Scientific American Brazil magazine. She was the first Brazilian speaker on TED Global in 2013.

She won the José Reis Prize of Science Communication in 2004.

See also
Evolutionary neuroscience
Evolution of the brain

Publications
 Human Advantage: A New Understanding of How Our Brain Became Remarkable. Editor: The Mit Press; (2016).

References

External links

 
 Suzana Herculano-Houzel's  Currículo Lattes at CNPq

1972 births
Brazilian atheists
Brazilian neuroscientists
Brazilian women neuroscientists
Brazilian women scientists
Brazilian scientists
People from Rio de Janeiro (city)
Federal University of Rio de Janeiro alumni
Academic staff of the Federal University of Rio de Janeiro
Living people
Vanderbilt University faculty
Brazilian expatriate academics in the United States
Max Planck Society alumni
Brazilian science writers